Juraj Križanić (c. 1618 – 12 September 1683), also known as Jurij Križanič or Yuriy Krizhanich, was a Croatian Catholic missionary who is often regarded as the earliest recorded pan-Slavist. His ideal, often misunderstood - even today - was to bring about a union of the churches, which Rome and Constantinople had tried to do without success for centuries. He believed that this might come about through closer relations between Slav Catholicism and the Russian Orthodox Church, and supported the idea that all Slavs had a common language and ethnic origin.

However, he was not a pan-Slav if this meant seeking the political unity of all Slav people under Russian leadership. He considered that the only possible role for the Tsar to 'correct' or unify the orthography and script used in Slav-language books and awaken Slav consciousness was through works conducive to education and logic. In extremis the South Slavs might join with the Russian tsar as a sovereign of the same language and people if the Catholic rulers supported his leadership in a war against the Ottomans.

After lengthy travels and fifteen years of exile in Siberia, Križanić died, misunderstood and disappointed, in battle during the Ottoman siege of Vienna in 1683. Although he had no direct followers, Križanić's work influenced many later South Slav thinkers who championed both reliance on Russia and South Slav cultural and political unification.

Biography

Early life, education, and early missionary work
Križanić was born in Obrh, near Ozalj (in present-day Croatia, then part of the  Habsburg Kingdom of Croatia) in 1618, a period of political turmoil and of Turkish invasions into Croatia. He attended a  Jesuit grammar school in Ljubljana and a Jesuit  gymnasium in Zagreb from 1629 to 1635. His father died when he was 17 years old, at approximately the same time he graduated from the gymnasium. He studied in Graz, then began attending the University of Bologna
in 1638 to study theology and graduated in 1640. Shortly after graduating Križanić began attending the Greek College of St. Athanasius, a center in Rome for the training of Catholic missionaries who would work with Orthodox Christians; he graduated from this College in 1642. By the end of his life he was proficient in ten languages. While Križanić had a strong desire to travel to Moscow with the ambitious goal of uniting the  Roman Catholic and  Russian Orthodox churches, he was assigned missionary duties in Zagreb, where he taught at the Zagreb Theological Seminary as well as serving as a priest in several neighboring towns.

Time in Russia
Križanić managed to secure permission from the papacy for a brief visit to Moscow from 25 October to 19 December 1647 as part of a Polish embassy. However, he was not able to secure permission for a prolonged stay in the Tsardom of Russia until 1658 (permission was retracted shortly after being issued, a fact that Križanić simply ignored) and he did not arrive in Moscow until 17 September 1659. One author writes that he pretended to be an Orthodox Serb. He was assigned the duty of translating Latin and Greek documents and of preparing an improved Slavic grammar. However, he was exiled to Siberia on 20 January 1661. The reason for his exile remains unknown. Possible explanations put forward have included the fact that he was a Roman Catholic priest, his criticism of Russian society and of the Greeks, with whom Patriarch Nikon of Moscow (in office: 1652-1666) was attempting reconciliation, and other political and social motives. Križanić postulated that he was exiled because of "some foolish thing" he had said to someone, and that whatever he had said had been mentioned to the authorities.

After having lived roughly a year and a half in the Russian capital, Križanić arrived in Tobolsk in Siberia, on 8 March 1661. He lived there for 15 years, surviving on a state stipend and working on the treatises On Divine Providence, On Politics, and On Interpretation of Historic Prognostications, amongst others. In these books, written in his self-devised "Common Slavonic language" (a Pan-Slavonic grammar named Grammatitchno Iskaziniye that incorporated numerous Slavic languages), he set forth a comprehensive program of reforms proposed for the Russian state, including reforms to  administration,  Russian serfdom, economic policy, education, grammar, and Russia's primitive agricultural system. Many of the reforms he recommended were in fact carried out by Peter the Great, although there is no concrete evidence of Križanić's direct influence in his doing so. Križanić's Politika which he wrote between 1663 and 1666, was published by Peter Bezsonov (Russia in the Seventeenth Century, 1859–60) and for the first time in English in 1985, and is his most well-known and influential work.

His appeal to the Tsar to head the Slavs in the fight against the Germans shows a remarkable political foresight. Tsar  Aleksei died in January 1676; Križanić was freed from exile by the new Tsar,  Feodor III,
on 5 March 1676.

Final years 
Križanić remained in Moscow until 1678, when he travelled to Vilnius and later to Warsaw.
He lived in Poland and joined the Jesuits. He accompanied a Polish force on its way to liberate besieged Vienna from the  Ottomans during the 1683 Battle of Vienna. He died near Vienna on 12 September 1683 while participating with the  Ukrainian troops fighting alongside the troops of the Polish king Jan Sobieski in the city's defence against the Turks.

Ideas and theories
Križanić was one of the earliest proponents of Pan-Slavism. The language he created and used in his writing was called Ruski jezik ("Russian language"), but in reality it was a mixture of several Slavic languages and was devised to serve as a symbol of and even to promote Slavic unity. He wanted to unite the Slavic nations under the Russian Tsar and unite Catholic and Orthodox against the German Protestants and Turkish Muslims.

A key component of Križanić's theories concerning necessary reforms for the Russian state were his "Five Principles of Power." His five principles were: Full autocracy (essentially absolute monarchy), closed borders, compulsory labor or a ban on idleness, government monopoly of foreign trade, and ideological conformity. Križanić argued that Russia would be strengthened if immigration were tightly restricted and if native Russians were prohibited from leaving the country without justification. The autocrat should use his power to eliminate bad customs, modernize the country and give the nobles and clergy privileges on the model to the Western Ständestaat.

His works, which also include writings on music and economics, were re-discovered and printed in the mid-19th century.

Important works
 The Križanić Memorandum of 1641 (1641)
 Gramatično izkazanje ob ruskom jeziku (1659-1666)
 On Politics also known as the Politika (in original "Razgovory o vladatelstvu") (1666)
 On Divine Providence (in original "De Providentia Dei") (1667)
 Holy Baptism (1669)
 An Interpretation of Historical Prophesies (1674)
 Chinese Foreign Trade (1675)
 History of Siberia (1680)

References
 Paulin-Gérard Scolardi, Krijanich, Messager de l'unité des Chrétiens et du panslavisme, Paris, Éditions A. et J. Picard, 1947.

Sources
 Vatroslav Jagić: Istoriia slavianskoi filologii, St. Petersburg, 1910
 
 

1618 births
1683 deaths
Linguists from Croatia
Croatian writers
Croats of Bosnia and Herzegovina
Croatian expatriates in Russia
Tsardom of Russia people
17th-century Croatian Roman Catholic priests
Constructed language creators
Writers about Russia
Pan-Slavism